The S-25 Berkut ("Berkut" means golden eagle in English) is a surface-to-air guided missile, the first operational SAM system in the Soviet Union. In the early 1950s it was tested at Kapustin Yar. It was deployed in several rings around Moscow starting in 1955 and became combat ready in June 1956. It was used only defensively at Moscow; the more mobile S-75 (SA-2 Guideline) would be used in almost all other locations. Several improvements were introduced over its long service lifetime, and the system was finally replaced by the S-300P in 1982.

Its NATO reporting name is SA-1 Guild. S-25 is short for Systema 25, referring to the entire system of missiles, radars, and launchers. Portions of the system include the V-300 missile, R-113 and B-200 radars, and A-11/A-12 antennas for the B-200.

History
Development of the S-25 was authorized on 9 August 1950 by a decision of USSR and was appended by Stalin: (We have to get the missile for air defense in a year). The system was assigned to design to SB-1 (Special Bureau No. 1).

The initial design included:
 E\F band A-100 "Kama" radar based in two concentric rings; a near ring - 25–30 km from Moscow, and a far ring, approximately 200–250 km from Moscow, for early warning and target detection.
B-200 missile targeting radars, deployed in two rings.
V-300 SAMs deployed around the B-200 radars.
G-400 Interceptor aircraft. These were Tu-4 with G-300 (izdelie 210, downsized version of V-300 with aerial launch) missiles.
Possibly, Tu-4 based AWACS aircraft D-500.

The implementation was assigned to the Third Main Agency, which was specially created, by the Soviet of Ministers of the USSR. SB-1 was converted to KB-1 (Design Bureau №1) headed by P.N. Kuksenko and S.L. Beria. Some captured German specialists were concentrated in department №38 of KB-1.

Test range trials of the first experimental system were conducted in January 1952. These tests led to the removal of the air based components of the Berkut system (G-400/G-300 and G-500).

The construction of ground infrastructure (designed by the Moscow division of Lengiprostroy, V.I. Rechkin) was done from 1953 through 1955 at 50 km and 90 km ranges from Moscow. There were about 2000 km of roads built by prisoners.

After the death of Stalin and arrest of L.P. Beria (the head of Soviet police and security, and the father of S.L. Beria) in June 1953, the KB-1 was reorganized and headed by Raspletin. The Third Main Agency was converted to Glavspetsmash and included into the Ministry of Medium Machine Building. The name Berkut was changed to Systema 25.

The first combat elements of S-25 were delivered to the military in 1954. In March 1954 most sites were being prepared for the installation of the missiles and launchers. The final tests were completed in the beginning of 1955. The first batteries entered service on 7 May 1955. The system entered combat duty in June 1956. The launchers were located at a distance of 75–85 km from Moscow, a dense ring (at a distance of 10–15 km from each other). The locations were masked by forests.

After the system have entered service some parts of Glavspetsmash (Glavspetsmontazh and Glavspetsmash) were disbanded, the KB-1 was transferred to the Ministry of Defense Industries.

In order to operate the S-25 system, the "Separate Army for Special Purposes" was established under the command of general-colonel K. Kazakov in the spring of 1955, being part of Soviet Air Defense Forces (PVO Strany).

A number of improvements was made to the initial S-25 design during the service. The latest modernized S-25M was retired and replaced with S-300P air defense complexes in 1982. Most sites of the original S-25 complex were dismantled in the 1990s and are now summer cottage developments for Moscow residents.

Surface-to-air Missile Complex S-25
The parts of the S-25 were designed in parallel. Some grounds were created at the Kapustin Yar test range to support the development of S-25:
№30 - technical position to prepare missiles
№31 - living rooms of servicemen
№32 - V-300 launcher
№33 - B-200 radar

The first tests of S-25 in full control mode were started 2 November 1952 (using radar-simulated target). The tests against parachute targets were done in the beginning of 1953. Tu-4 drones were used for moving target tests from 26 April to 18 May 1953. There were 81 launches during trials from 18 September 1952 to 18 May 1953. Additional tests were done in September–October 1953 against Il-28 and Tu-4 drones.

The decision of the government to build a full scale S-25 complex at the Kapustin Yar was made in January 1954. The complex was sampled for the state trials 25 June 1954. The trials were conducted from 1 October 1954 to 1 April 1955 and included 69 launches at Il-28 and Tu-4 drones (including simultaneous launch of 20 missiles at 20 targets).
The complex was capable to fire at 20 targets with 1 or 2 missiles simultaneously having up to 60 missiles ready to launch. The startup time was 5 minutes (for 18 target channels).

There were 56 S-25 series-built complexes manufactured and deployed around the Moscow area, plus one series-built and one experimental deployed at the Kapustin Yar test range.

B-200 Missile Targeting Radar
Each site was equipped with a B-200 guidance system, including a track while scan radar (designated Yo-Yo by US intelligence). The system also incorporated fire-control system equipment which enabled each site to engage as many as 10 targets simultaneously, each with two missiles.

The B-200 radar prototype was tested in the middle of 1950.

Surface-to-air Missile V-300
The first V-300 missile was fired 25 July 1951 at the Kapustin Yar test range.

The missile, which went by a variety of names depending on the version, used a single liquid-propellant rocket motor. Although its maximum speed was on the order of Mach 2.5, it had a low initial velocity which limited its engagement capability against supersonic targets. Its maximum intercept range varied depending upon the approach and type of target; against a directly incoming, high-flying B-52 its range was on the order of 30 km.

By 1959, a total of about 32,000 V-300 missiles had been manufactured.

Operators

Current operators
 - Now, these missiles used as targets for training SAM systems. Strizh target-missile (system S-25M) in service as of 2011. Firing more than 11 000 missiles.
 - 72 delivered in 1961.

Former operators
 - Retired in 1982, but passed on to Russia and reused for training purposes.

References

Cold War surface-to-air missiles of the Soviet Union
Science and technology in the Soviet Union
Lavochkin
S-025
Target missiles
Military equipment introduced in the 1950s